"Let's Love" is a song by French DJ David Guetta and Australian singer-songwriter Sia. It was released as a single on 11 September 2020 through Parlophone. The song was written by Guetta, Giorgio Tuinfort, Marcus van Wattum and Sia.

At the APRA Music Awards of 2022, the song was nominated for Most Performed Dance/Electronic Work.

Background
David Guetta previously collaborated with Sia on the singles "Titanium", "She Wolf (Falling to Pieces)", "Bang My Head", "Helium" and "Flames". Guetta revealed he was in Miami during the COVID-19 pandemic when he texted Sia and asked if she wanted to "save the world with a happy record and go against the trend". He originally sent Sia piano chords, on which Sia recorded vocals and sent him back a ballad. Guetta wanted the track to feel "happier", and turned it into an '80s synth-pop track. Guetta told Forbes that Pat Benatar, liked by both Sia and himself, was a big influence for "Let's Love".

The single was announced on 27 August 2020 through Guetta's social media platforms, and made available for pre-save on streaming platforms. The track was previewed on TikTok prior to release; Guetta added a statement, saying; "What I love is being in the studio and making music, especially here in Ibiza. Tell me what you love. Tell me what you love, show me what you love. Send me your videos, anything you're passion about. I think life is nothing without a passion and I want us to celebrate life together". Regarding the song release, Guetta stated that "during this time of isolation, I've been incredibly inspired to release music that has an uplifting energy".

Composition and reception 
"Let's Love" is a synth-pop, synthwave and new wave song with '80s influences. It was written by David Guetta, Giorgio Tuinfort, Marcus van Wattum and Sia in the key of D minor. Sia's vocals in the song span a range of F3 to D5.

Ben Kaye of Consequence of Sound described the song as "an uplifting '80s banger" with "a slapping '80s beat that's a few electronic note removed from Sing Street". The Official Charts Company also described "Let's Love" as a track with "glimmering synths and an uplifting tempo that juxtapose the trap, alternative, and emo-rap landscape of 2020 in music." Various journalists also noted the track's similarity to Pat Benatar's "Love Is a Battlefield".

Track listings 

 Digital download and streaming

 "Let's Love" – 3:20

 Digital download and streaming – David Guetta & MORTEN Future Rave Remix

 "Let's Love" (David Guetta & MORTEN Future Rave Remix) – 3:42
 "Let's Love" (David Guetta & MORTEN Future Rave Remix) [Extended] – 4:39

 Digital download and streaming – Cesqeaux Remix

 "Let's Love" (Cesqeaux Remix) – 3:26
 "Let's Love" (Cesqeaux Remix) [Extended] – 4:00

 Digital download and streaming – Robin Schulz Remix

 "Let's Love" (Robin Schulz Remix) – 2:52
 "Let's Love" (Robin Schulz Remix) [Extended] – 4:13
 Digital download and streaming – Acoustic

 "Let's Love" (Acoustic) – 3:25
 "Let's Love" – 3:20

 Digital download and streaming – Vintage Culture, Fancy Inc Remix

 "Let's Love" (Vintage Culture, Fancy Inc Remix) – 3:40
 "Let's Love" (Vintage Culture, Fancy Inc Remix) [Extended] – 5:26

 Digital download and streaming – DJs from Mars Remix 

 "Let's Love" (DJs from Mars Remix) – 3:10
 "Let's Love" (DJs from Mars Remix) [Extended] – 4:21

 Digital download and streaming – Aazar Remix 

 "Let's Love" (Aazar Remix) – 4:02

Personnel
Credits adapted from Tidal.

 David Guetta – production, instruments, programming
 Sia Furler – lead vocals
 Giorgio Tuinfort – production, instruments, piano, programming
 Marcus van Wattum – production, instruments, programming
 Marcel Schimscheimer – bass
 Pierre-Luc Rioux – guitar
 Peppe Folliero – mastering, mixing

Charts

Weekly charts

Year-end charts

Certifications

Release history

References

2020 songs
2020 singles
David Guetta songs
Sia (musician) songs
Parlophone singles
Song recordings produced by David Guetta
Songs written by Giorgio Tuinfort
Songs written by Sia (musician)
Synthwave songs
Number-one singles in Israel